Pingasa abyssiniaria is a moth of the family Geometridae first described by Achille Guenée in 1858. It is found in Ethiopia and South Africa.

Subspecies
Pingasa abyssiniaria abyssiniaria
Pingasa abyssiniaria rufata D. S. Fletcher, 1956

References

Pseudoterpnini
Moths of Africa
Moths described in 1858
Taxa named by Achille Guenée